Kyaswa of Sagaing (also known as Kyawswa; 1323–1349) was king of Sagaing from 1339 to 1349. The eldest son of the founder of the kingdom Saw Yun (r. 1315−27) was placed on the throne by Chief Minister Nanda Pakyan who ran the country.

Early life
Kyaswa was born to Queen Saw Hnaung and King Saw Yun of Sagaing on 9 April 1323. He was the second of the couple's four children, and a grandson of kings Thihathu of Pinya and Kyawswa of Pagan. His father died in February 1327. Because Kyaswa, the eldest son, was not yet four years old, his half-uncle Tarabya I succeeded the throne, marrying Saw Hnaung as his chief queen. Though it is unclear if Tarabya ever planned to hand over the reins to Kyaswa when the latter became an adult, Kyaswa, as the eldest son of Saw Yun and as the eldest son of Tarabya's chief queen Saw Hnaung, was at least the heir presumptive.

The arrangement lasted until 1335/36 when Tarabya's own son Shwetaungtet overthrew his father and seized the throne. Fearing the life of her children, Saw Hnaung with the help of Chief Minister Nanda Pakyan sent the children (and Thado Hsinhtein, the husband of the eldest child Soe Min) to Mindon, deep inside Pinya's territory. For the next three years, Saw Hnaung, who may have even become a lover of Nanda Pakyan, kept bribing the powerful minister to keep quiet.

Accession
Then a series of events led Kyaswa to the throne. In 1339, Shwetaungtet, having discovered their whereabouts, came to Mindon with an expeditionary force, and brought them back to Sagaing. But upon return to the palace, loyalists of the deposed king Tarabya ambushed and killed Shwetaungtet although they were later defeated by the palace guards. Nanda Pakyan had Tarabya executed, and placed Kyaswa on the throne. Kyaswa took the reign name of Thiri Tri Bhawanaditya Pawara Dhamma Yaza at his accession.

Reign
His first act as king was to reappoint Nanda Pakyan as the Chief Minister and Commander-in-Chief with the title of Thubarit. The 16-year-old monarch essentially allowed Nanda Pakyan's court to continue running the kingdom. His reign was largely peaceful. In Central Burma, he secured peace with Sagaing's cross-river rival  Pinya by marrying Saw Pa Oh, daughter of King Uzana I of Pinya. (The peace between the two kingdoms was maintained even after Uzana I was pushed out by Kyawswa I between 1340 and 1344.) In the north, the Shan states were still fighting a war of independence against their Mongol overlords, and were not yet the threat they would become to Central Burmese states in the late 1350s.

His reign lasted over nine years. Surviving inscriptions from the era report no particular issues during his reign. Kyaswa left an inscription in 1343/44 at the Thamanda Pagoda (on the route between Mindon and Sagaing) where he and his two queens donated land and a monastery. The inscription also recounts his exile in Mindon and the attack by Shwetaungtet. Another contemporary inscription states the king gave presents to his nephew Prince Rahula (future King Thado Minbya) on 24 January 1347. He died  March 1349.

Family
Kyaswa had at least two queens. One of his queens was Saw Pa Oh; their daughter Saw Sala later became a queen of King Uzana II of Pinya.

Chronicle reporting differences
The royal chronicles do not agree on his birth and death dates.

Ancestry

Notes

References

Bibliography
 
 
 
 
 
 

Myinsaing dynasty
Sagaing dynasty
1349 deaths
1323 births
14th-century Burmese monarchs